Chuka/Igambang'ombe is one of three constituencies in Tharaka-Nithi County in Kenya.

References 

Constituencies in Tharaka-Nithi County